Defending champion Novak Djokovic defeated Andy Murray in a rematch of the previous year's final, 6–1, 7–5, 7–6(7–3) to win the men's singles tennis title at the 2016 Australian Open. It was his record-equaling sixth Australian Open men's singles title (tying Roy Emerson) and eleventh major title overall. This was the fourth Australian Open final between the pair. Murray became the second man in the Open Era to lose five finals at the same major (after Ivan Lendl at the US Open), and is the only one to have the distinction without having won the title.

Australian Lleyton Hewitt, a former finalist, two-time major champion and former world No. 1, played his last professional singles match at this event. He lost to David Ferrer in the second round.

Seeds

Qualifying

Wildcards

Draw

Finals

Top half

Section 1

Section 2

Section 3

Section 4

Bottom half

Section 5

Section 6

Section 7

Section 8

References
General

Men's Singles Main Draw on ausopen.com

Specific

External links
 2016 Australian Open – Men's draws and results at the International Tennis Federation

Men's Singles
Australian Open (tennis) by year – Men's singles